Lecanora hafelliana is a species of corticolous (bark-dwelling), crustose lichen in the family Lecanoraceae. It is found in South Korea and in China, where it is fairly common on the bark of deciduous trees such as maple, birch, dogwood, and oak. The lichen was formally described as a new species in 2011 by  Lei Lü, Yogesh Joshi, and Jae-Seoun Hur. In China, it was recorded growing on the bark of Korean pine. The lichen has a dull whitish to ash-grey crust-like thallus with a definite margin, but lacking a prothallus. Lecanora hafelliana contains several secondary compounds, including atranorin, zeorin, usnic acid, a complex of compounds related to stictic acid, and hafellic acid. Its specific epithet alludes to the presence of this latter compound.

See also
List of Lecanora species

References

hafelliana
Lichen species
Lichens described in 2011
Lichens of Asia